Lesa Semmler is a Canadian politician, who was elected to the Legislative Assembly of the Northwest Territories in the 2019 election. She represents the electoral district of Inuvik Twin Lakes.

Prior to her election to the legislature, she worked for the Inuvialuit Regional Corporation as their Health Navigator working on numerous health files at the local regional and national level. She was the Nurse manager prior to her work with IRC at the Inuvik Regional Hospital. She has also been an activist on the issue of missing and murdered Indigenous women, as she was raised primarily by her great-grandparents after her mother was murdered by her common law partner when she was just eight years old.

References 

Living people
Members of the Legislative Assembly of the Northwest Territories
Women MLAs in the Northwest Territories
People from Inuvik
21st-century Canadian politicians
21st-century Canadian women politicians
Year of birth missing (living people)
Inuvialuit people
First Nations women in politics
Missing and Murdered Indigenous Women and Girls movement